Iluppaiyur is a panchayat and village in Virudhunagar district in Tamil Nadu, India. The name Iluppaiyur is derived from "Iluppai tree".

Demography
People of the Nadar and Chettiar caste live in the village.

Economy
The economy is based on agriculture. The Gundaru, a tributary of the Vaigai River, flows through Iluppaiyur, but most of the year it is dry. Water comes only during floods.

Festivals
Panguni Pongal is one of the most popular festivals of Iluppaiyur. This festival falls in April every year. Pongal festival lasts for five days.

Education
The name of the school is NKV SALA(Nadar Kshathriya Vidhya Sala)

Adjacent communities

Reference 

Villages in Virudhunagar district
Cities and towns in Virudhunagar district